Matthew Hay (born 16 October 1997) is a New Zealand cricketer. He made his List A debut on 1 December 2020, for Canterbury in the 2020–21 Ford Trophy. He made his Twenty20 debut on 29 December 2020, for Canterbury in the 2020–21 Super Smash.

References

External links
 

1997 births
Living people
New Zealand cricketers
Canterbury cricketers
Place of birth missing (living people)